The 2000–01 North West Counties Football League season was the 19th in the history of the North West Counties Football League, a football competition in England. Teams were divided into two divisions: Division One and Division Two.

Division One 

Division One featured three new teams:

 Curzon Ashton, promoted as runners-up of Division Two
 Flixton, relegated from the NPL Division One
 Woodley Sports, promoted as champions of Division Two

League table

Division Two 

Division Two featured four new teams:

 Atherton Laburnum Rovers, relegated from Division One
 Bootle, relegated from Division One
 Padiham, promoted as champions of the West Lancashire Football League Division One
 Stone Dominoes, promoted as champions of the Midland Football League

League table

References

 http://www.tonykempster.co.uk/archive00-01/nwc1.htm
 http://www.tonykempster.co.uk/archive00-01/nwc2.htm

External links 
 NWCFL Official Site

North West Counties Football League seasons
8